The EMD GP7 is a four-axle (B-B) diesel-electric locomotive built by General Motors Electro-Motive Division and General Motors Diesel between October 1949 and May 1954.

Power was provided by an EMD 567B 16-cylinder engine which generated .  The GP7 was offered both with and without control cabs, and those built without control cabs were called a GP7B. Five GP7B's were built between March and April 1953. The GP7 was the first EMD road locomotive to use a hood unit design instead of a car-body design. This proved to be more efficient than the car body design as the hood unit cost less to build, was cheaper and easier to maintain, and had much better front and rear visibility for switching.

Of the 2,734 GP7's built, 2,620 were for American railroads (including 5 GP7B units built for the Atchison, Topeka and Santa Fe Railway), 112 were built for Canadian railroads, and 2 were built for Mexican railroads.

This was the first model in EMD's GP (General Purpose) series of locomotives. Concurrently, EMD offered a six-axle (C-C) SD (Special Duty) locomotive, the SD7. The GP7 was replaced by the GP9 model in GM-EMD's GP sequence.

History 
ALCO, Fairbanks-Morse, and Baldwin had all introduced road switchers before EMD, whose first attempt at the road-switcher, the BL2 was unsuccessful in the market, selling only 58 units in the 14 months it was in production. Its replacement, the GP7, swapped the truss-framed stressed car body for an un-stressed body on a frame made from flat, formed and rolled structural steel members and steel forgings welded into a single structure (a "weldment"), a basic design which is still being employed today. Unfortunately, in heavy service, the GP7’s frame would bow and sag over time. This defect was corrected in later models. 

The GP7 proved very popular, and EMD was barely able to meet demand, even after opening a second assembly plant at Cleveland, Ohio. Later, locomotives in EMD's GP-series came to be nicknamed ‘Geeps’. Many GP7s both high and short-hood can still be found in service today on shortline railroads and industrial operators. Although most Class 1 roads stopped using these locomotives by the 1980s some remain in rebuilt form on some major Class I railroads, as switcher locomotives.. The "GP" designation stood for "general purpose", while the "7" had no meaning other than matching the EMD F7 cab unit then in production.

Identification 
The GP7, GP9 and GP18 locomotives share a similar car-body that evolved over time. Most GP7s had three sets of ventilation grills under the cab (where the GP9 only had one), and two pair of grills at the end of the long hood (where only the pair nearest the end was retained on the GP9).  However, some late GP7s were built with car-bodies that were identical to early GP9s. Early GP7s had a solid skirt above the fuel tank, while late GP7s and early GP9s had access holes in the skirt (see photo of Illinois Terminal 1605, top left). Many railroads later removed most of the skirt to improve access and inspection.

Locomotives could be built with the engineer’s control stand installed for either the long hood, or the short hood designated as the front. Two control stands for either direction running was also an option, but one end would still be designated as the front for maintenance purposes. The GP7 was also available with or without dynamic brakes, and a steam generator installed in the short hood was also an option. In the latter case, the  fuel tank was divided, with half for diesel fuel, and half for boiler water. One option available for locomotives without dynamic brakes, was to remove the two  air reservoir tanks from under the frame, and replace them with four  tanks that were installed on the roof of the locomotive, above the prime mover. These "torpedo tubes" as they were nicknamed, enabled the fuel and water tanks to be increased to  each, although some railroads opted for roof-mounted air tanks and  fuel tanks on their freight ‘Geeps’.

Original buyers

Locomotives built by Electro-Motive Division, USA

Locomotives built by General Motors Diesel, Canada

GP7 locomotives were built at GMD's London Ontario plant for domestic Canadian railway purchasers, and for some US railroads like the C&O and Wabash who owned and operated over trackage in Canada (specifically the southern Ontario area).

Rebuilds, modifications and conversions

There are five GP7s on A J Kristopan's EMD Serial number page that reused previous serial numbers: B&O 6405 (preserved), CRI&P 1308 (2nd), L&N 501 (2nd) and 502 (2nd), and SLSF 615 (2nd). These rebuilt units were rebuilt as new on new frames. Another rebuild by GMD is that CN 4824 was rebuilt as a GP7 with parts from an F3A in October 1958.

Over 100 GP7s and four of the GP7Bs were built with 567BC or 567C engines starting in March 1953 through May 1954. These are noted on the roster above.

Many railroads rebuilt their GP7s with low short hoods; some railroads went further in their rebuilding than others.

Illinois Central Railroad rebuilt most of its GP7s with 567BC engines, 4-stack exhausts, paper air-intake filters, 26-L brakes (their original 6-BL brakes made them operationally incompatible with locomotives fitted with 24-RL brakes). All but the first locomotive rebuilt had their front (short) hood reduced in height for improved crew visibility. The IC designated these rebuilt locomotives GP8.  The IC acquired many second-hand units through Precision National Corporation (PNC), and then started offering their GP8/GP10 rebuilding services to other railroads through their Paducah Shops (note, a rebuilt "Paducah Geep" was designated a GP8 or GP10 depending on the power output of the rebuilt engine, not necessarily what it was rebuilt from).

In 1960 the Alaska Railroad purchased a dozen GP7Ls from the US Army and rebuilt eleven of them in 1965 with low short hoods for better visual clearance. One of the ten remaining Alaska GP7s was rebuilt by Morrison-Knudsen in 1976. The other nine units were rebuilt at Paducah Shops in 1976-1977.

Canadian Pacific Railway rebuilt their GP7 fleet in the early 1980's as GP7u units for yard service, including a chopped short hood, new numberboards and front cab windows, and upgrading the 567B prime movers with 645 power assemblies and to "BC" engine block specs (some upgraded with 567C engine blocks out of retired F-units).

Preservation

Numerous GP7s have been preserved on tourist lines and in museums. Holders include:

 Conway Scenic Railroad
 Florida Railroad Museum
 Illinois Railway Museum
 Lebanon Mason Monroe Railroad
 Minnesota Transportation Museum 
 Tennessee Valley Railroad Museum
 United Railroad Historical Society of New Jersey
 Western Pacific Railroad Museum
 Grand Canyon Railway
 Toronto Railway Museum
 Southeastern Railway Museum
 Hocking Valley Scenic Railway
 Grapevine Vintage Railroad
 Conrad Yelvington Distributors Railroad

See also 
List of GM-EMD locomotives
List of GMD Locomotives

References 

 
 
 
  
 
 
 
 http://utahrails.net/ajkristopans/GMEXPORT2_22-Sep-2015_update.txt Export GP7 serial numbers
 
 
 
EMD Product Reference Data Card dated January 1, 1959 has the 567BC and 567C engine data used in the as-built roster.

B-B locomotives
GP07
GP07
Diesel-electric locomotives of the United States
Railway locomotives introduced in 1949
Locomotives with cabless variants
Standard gauge locomotives of the United States
Standard gauge locomotives of Canada
Standard gauge locomotives of Mexico
Diesel-electric locomotives of Canada
Diesel-electric locomotives of Mexico